Christopher Jessup may refer to:
 Christopher Jessup (judge)
 Christopher Jessup (composer)